Ramesh Kumar may refer to:

 Ramesh Kumar (politician), Indian politician
 K. R. Ramesh Kumar, Indian politician
 Ramesh Kumar (kabaddi), Indian Kabaddi player
 Ramesh Kumar (wrestler), Indian wrestler
 Ramesh Kumar (nephrologist), Indian physician
 Ramesh Kumar Nibhoria, Indian engineer and entrepreneur
 Ramesh Kumar Pandey, Indian academic
 Ramesh Kumar Vankwani, Pakistani politician
 Ramesh Kumar (cricketer), Indian cricketer